The 1990–91 Illinois State Redbirds men's basketball team represented Illinois State University during the 1990–91 NCAA Division I men's basketball season. The Redbirds, led by second year head coach Bob Bender, played their home games at Redbird Arena and competed as a member of the Missouri Valley Conference.

They finished the season 5–23, 4–14 in conference play to finish in a tie for eighth place. They were the number eight seed for the Missouri Valley Conference tournament. They lost their opening round game to Drake University.

Roster

Schedule

|-
!colspan=9 style=|Regular Season

|-
!colspan=9 style=|PepsiMissouri Valley Conference {MVC} tournament

References

Illinois State Redbirds men's basketball seasons
Illinois State
Illinois State Redbirds men's basketball
Illinois State Redbirds men's basketball